Joseph Carlton McGlone (September 12, 1896 – January 25, 1963) was an American football blocking back who played one season with the Providence Steam Roller of the National Football League. He played college football at Harvard University and attended Phillips Academy in Andover, Massachusetts. He was also a member of the Boston Bulldogs of the American Football League.

References

External links
Just Sports Stats

1896 births
1963 deaths
Players of American football from Massachusetts
American football quarterbacks
Phillips Academy alumni
Harvard Crimson football players
Providence Steam Roller players
Boston Bulldogs (AFL) players
People from Natick, Massachusetts
Sportspeople from Middlesex County, Massachusetts